Major General Colin Terry Shortis  (18 January 1934 – 8 January 2017) was a senior British Army officer.

Biography
Born on 18 January 1934, Colin Shortis was educated at Bedford School. He enlisted in the British Army in 1951 and received his first commission in the Royal Fusiliers in 1953. He transferred to the Dorset Regiment in 1953, and served in Hong Kong, the Suez Canal Zone, with the British Army of the Rhine, in Aden, Singapore and British Guiana, between 1953 and 1963. He became commanding officer of the 1st Battalion Devonshire and Dorset Regiment in 1974. He went on to be Commander of the 8th Infantry Brigade in 1978, Commander of the British Military Advisory and Training Team in Zimbabwe in 1982 and Director of Infantry in 1983. His last appointment was as General Officer Commanding, North West District in 1986 before retiring 1989.

Shortis was appointed a Commander of the Order of the British Empire in 1980 and a Companion of the Order of the Bath in 1988.

He was given the colonelcy of the Devonshire and Dorset Regiment in 1984, holding the position until 1990.

He died on 8 January 2017 at the age of 82.

References

 

1934 births
2017 deaths
British Army generals
People educated at Bedford School
Companions of the Order of the Bath
Commanders of the Order of the British Empire